Urdaneta Cathedral, formally referred to as the Our Lady of the Immaculate Conception Cathedral Parish, is a cathedral of the Roman Catholic Church located in the city of Urdaneta, Pangasinan in the Ilocos Region of the Philippines. Situated at Barangay Poblacion of Urdaneta, it is the seat of the Roman Catholic Diocese of Urdaneta and is dedicated to Mary under the title of Our Lady of the Immaculate Conception.

History
Prior to the founding of Urdaneta as a municipality, its present-day Poblacion was initially settled by residents and families from Villasis, Santa Barbara and Manaoag by the close of the 17th century. Migrants from Ilocos and La Union from the north also resettled in the area. By mid-19th century, the continuous population growth prompted the residents to establish a new pueblo (municipality) which comprised parts of Asingan, Binalonan, Malasiqui, Manaoag, Mangaldan, Santa Barbara and Villasis. The new municipality was named Urdaneta and was formally founded in 1858, the same year of establishment of Urdaneta as a visita. Tomas Manzano from Santa served as Urdaneta's first cabeza de barangay while Fr. Nicolas Manrique y Alonzo was tasked to serve as the towns's first pastor. The parish priest of Binalonan served the community of Urdaneta prior to Fr. Manrique's term at the latter.

The visita'''s first church was a lean-to structure. In 1863, Urdaneta's visita'' was promoted to a parish by the Dominicans. A stone church was then built but was not finished due to its massive size and the town being relatively young. Aside from being Urdaneta's parish priest, Fr. Manrique also laid plans for the municipality and ordered the transfer of an old camarin which would serve as a house of worship, to the site where the first church of Urdaneta was later built. Fr. Rafael Cano spearheaded the construction of the church on March 4, 1884. The three-naved church was damaged by the bombings during World War II.

The Diocese of Urdaneta, along with Alaminos, was canonically erected on January 12, 1985, during the papacy of Pope John Paul II. Urdaneta's Immaculate Conception Church was designated as the diocesan seat of the bishopric.

The reredos or retablo of the cathedral are works of Kapampangan artist Willy Layug, who also worked on the cathedrals of Dagupan, Bacolod, and San Jose in Nueva Ecija.

Gallery

References

External links
 Facebook page  

Urdaneta, Pangasinan
Roman Catholic churches in Pangasinan
Roman Catholic cathedrals in the Philippines
Spanish Colonial architecture in the Philippines
19th-century Roman Catholic church buildings in the Philippines
20th-century Roman Catholic church buildings in the Philippines